Sison can refer to:

 Sison, Pangasinan, Philippines
 Sison, Surigao del Norte, Philippines
 Sison (plant), a genus of plants in the family Apiaceae

People 
Sison is a Filipino surname. Notable people with the surname include:
 Jose Maria Sison (1939–2022), founder of the Communist Party of the Philippines in 1968 and the New People's Army guerrilla group in 1969 
 Connie Sison (born 1975), Filipina journalist
 Boyet Sison (1963–2022), Filipino journalist and sports commentator

See also
 Sisson, a surname